King and Country (stylised as King & Country) is a 1964 British war film directed by Joseph Losey, shot in black and white, and starring Dirk Bogarde and Tom Courtenay. The film was adapted for the screen by British screenwriter Evan Jones based on the play Hamp by John Wilson and a 1955 novel by James Lansdale Hodson.

Plot
During the First World War in 1917, in the British trenches at Passchendaele, an army private, Arthur Hamp (Tom Courtenay) is accused of desertion. He is to be defended at his trial by Captain Hargreaves (Dirk Bogarde). Hamp had been a volunteer at the outbreak of the war and was the sole survivor of his company, but then decided to "go for a walk"; he had contemplated walking to his home in London but after more than 24 hours on the road, he is picked up by the Military Police and sent back to his unit to face court-martial for desertion.

Hargreaves is initially impatient with the simple-minded Hamp, but comes to identify with his plight. Following testimony from an unsympathetic doctor (Leo McKern) (whose solution to all ailments is to prescribe laxatives), Hargreaves is unable to persuade the court to consider the possibility that Hamp may have been suffering from shell shock. He is found guilty, but the court's recommendation for mercy is overruled by higher command, who wish to make an example of Hamp to bolster morale in his division. He is shot by firing squad, but as he is not killed outright Hargreaves has to finish him off with a revolver. His family are informed that he has been killed in action.

Cast
 Dirk Bogarde as Captain Charles Hargreaves
 Tom Courtenay as Private Arthur Hamp
 Leo McKern as Captain O'Sullivan
 Barry Foster as Lieutenant Jack Webb
 Peter Copley as Colonel
 James Villiers as Captain Midgley
 Jeremy Spenser as Private Sparrow
 Barry Justice as Lieutenant Prescott
 Vivian Matalon as Padre
 Keith Buckley as Corporal of the Guard
 Derek Partridge as Captain Court Martial
 Brian Tipping as Lieutenant Court Martial

Production
The novel had been filmed for Australian TV in 1962 as The Case of Private Hamp.

Reception
The film was re-released by American International Pictures (AIP) in 1966 and developed a cult following. However in 1973 Losey said that records had the film recording a loss.

The New York Times called it "an impressive achievement," noting "As usual, Mr. Losey has drawn the best from his actors," and concluding that "Some of its scenes are so strong they shock. Those who can take it will find it a shattering experience."

Awards
Tom Courtenay received the award for the Best Actor for his role as Hamp at the 1964 Venice Film Festival, where the film was also nominated for the Golden Lion. The film was nominated for four 1965 BAFTA awards, including Best Film.

References

External links

See also
 British Army during World War I

1964 films
1960s English-language films
1964 drama films
1964 war films
British black-and-white films
British war drama films
Anti-war films about World War I
Military courtroom films
Films about capital punishment
Films about deserters
Films based on adaptations
British films based on plays
Films based on British novels
Films directed by Joseph Losey
Films set in 1917
Western Front (World War I) films
1960s British films